Feng Lüdong (born 23 October 1991) is a Chinese weightlifter, competing in the 69 kg division until 2018 and 73 kg and 67 kg starting in 2018 after the International Weightlifting Federation reorganized the categories.

Career
In 2018 he competed at the 2018 World Weightlifting Championships in the 73 kg division, and won a bronze medal in the snatch portion. He competed at the 2019 Asian Weightlifting Championships winning a silver medal in the 67 kg division.

Major results

References

External links

Living people
1991 births
Chinese male weightlifters
World Weightlifting Championships medalists
21st-century Chinese people